Debbie Ann Clary (born August 29, 1959 in Shelby, North Carolina) is a  Republican member of the North Carolina General Assembly representing the state's 46th Senate district, including constituents in Rutherford and Cleveland counties. She previously served in the state House serving the 110th district.

Clary is a marketing professional from Cherryville, North Carolina. In 2008, Clary retired her house seat to run for N.C. Senate District 46. On November 4, 2008, Clary defeated former Rutherford County Clerk of Court Keith H. Melton to win the seat.

In June 2011, Clary announced that she would be retiring from the State Senate. Her resignation became effective January 10, 2012.

Electoral history

2010

2008

2006

2004

2002

2000

References

External links

|-

|-

1959 births
Living people
People from Shelby, North Carolina
People from Cherryville, North Carolina
Gardner–Webb University alumni
American marketing people
Marketing women
20th-century American politicians
20th-century American women politicians
21st-century American politicians
21st-century American women politicians
Women state legislators in North Carolina
Republican Party members of the North Carolina House of Representatives
Republican Party North Carolina state senators